Ekco Football Club is a football club based in Southend-on-Sea, England.

History
Ekco were founded in 1929, as a works team for the workers of EKCO in Southend-on-Sea. In 1945, Ekco joined the London League, entering the FA Cup for the first time in 1946. In 1981, the club joined the Essex Olympian League, remaining in the league until 2000.

Ground
During Ekco's stay in the London League, the club played at the Ekco Sports Ground in Southend-on-Sea.

Records
Best FA Cup performance: Second qualifying round, 1947–48

References

London League (football)
Works association football teams in England
1929 establishments in England
Association football clubs established in 1929
Football clubs in Essex
Sports clubs in Southend-on-Sea
Essex Olympian Football League
Southend Borough Combination